Jean Djorkaeff (born 27 October 1939) is a French former professional footballer and manager. As a player, he operated as a defender.

Early life
Djorkaeff was born in the French commune of Charvieu, located in the département of Isère. He was born to a Kalmyk father and Polish mother.

Club career
Djorkaeff made his debut as a professional footballer playing for Lyon in a match against Limoges on 28 December 1958. Though he started out as a striker, he was famous for his work as central defender and appeared in around 400 matches in the French football league. He spent a total of 16 seasons within the first two tiers, during which he played with only four clubs (eight seasons with Lyon, four with Marseille, two with Paris Saint-Germain, and two with Paris FC). He won the Coupe de France twice, the first time with Lyon in 1964 and the second with Marseille in 1969.

International career
At international level, Djorkaeff also played for France on 48 occasions between 1964 and 1972, scoring 3 goals. He represented his nation at the 1966 FIFA World Cup.

Managerial career 
Djorkaeff would become interim manager of Paris FC for two matches in 1972 while he was a player at the club. After his retirement from playing football, he would coach UGA Lyon-Décines. In 1981, Djorkaeff became manager of Grenoble. After two seasons at the Division 2 club, he left for first tier Saint-Étienne, where he would stay one season. From 1986 to 1987, he worked as assistant manager in the France national team. Later on, he would return to his position at UGA Lyon-Décines.

After football
Djorkaeff would go on to serve as the president of the Coupe de France commission in 2000, a role he stayed at for seven years. In April 2007, he became general manager of UGA Lyon-Décines.

Personal life
Jean's sons Youri and Micha Djorkaeff, and grandson Oan Djorkaeff, were also footballers. Youri played for France in the 1998 and 2002 FIFA World Cups, and at UEFA Euro 1996 and UEFA Euro 2000.

Jean's nickname is "Tchouki".

Honours 
Lyon
 Coupe de France: 1963–64; runner-up 1962–63

Marseille
 Coupe de France: 1968–69

Paris Saint-Germain
 Division 2: 1970–71

Individual
 Best full-back in France: 1970–71

References

External links
 
 Profile on OM4ever 
 Interview with Jean Djorkaeff 

1939 births
Living people
French people of Polish descent
French people of Kalmyk descent
Sportspeople from Isère
French footballers
Association football defenders
France international footballers
Olympique Lyonnais players
Olympique de Marseille players
Paris Saint-Germain F.C. players
Paris FC players
Ligue 1 players
Ligue 2 players
1966 FIFA World Cup players
French football managers
Paris FC managers
Grenoble Foot 38 managers
AS Saint-Étienne managers
Djorkaeff family
Footballers from Auvergne-Rhône-Alpes